Greta Varlese (born 21 August 1998) is an Italian fashion model. She was once ranked among the top 50 models in the world by models.com. Vogue has called her a "powerhouse".

Early life
Varlese's mother is German, and her father is Italian. She never considered a serious modeling career before doing the Elite Model Look contest, as she was not interested in fashion.

Career
Varlese was discovered by Elite Models during their Elite Model Look contest in China; although she didn't win, she made it to the top 10.

Just months later she debuted as a Givenchy exclusive in the F/W 2015 Men’s Show, personally handpicked by Riccardo Tisci, which catapulted her career. In her first fashion show, she opened for Givenchy. She considers doing three Givenchy campaigns in a row her "greatest achievement". 

In her first season she did 75 shows, including Prada, Chanel, Dior, and Versace; she opened Elie Saab, Kenzo, and Rag & Bone.

In 2016, she starred in campaigns for Belstaff x Liv Tyler, Prada, Vera Wang, McQ, Givenchy, Zara, and Valentino.

For the A/W 2017 season she did over 32 shows in one month.

She has appeared in Vogue Italia, Vogue Paris, Teen Vogue, W magazine, and British Vogue and she appeared on the cover of Harper’s Bazaar UK, Japan, Korea and Kazakhstan.

References 

1998 births
Living people
Italian female models
Italian people of German descent
Models from Milan
People of Calabrian descent